Rossella may refer to:

 Rossella (given name), female given name
 Rossella (TV series), an Italian television series
 Rossella (sponge), a genus of sponges in the family Rossellidae]

See also
 Rosella (disambiguation)
 Rozella (disambiguation)